Nook is the second full studio album by The Notwist. The album explores the band's earlier sound of hardcore punk and punk as opposed to electronica. It was re-released in 2003 following the success of Neon Golden.

Track listing
All tracks written by Markus Acher, unless otherwise noted.

"Belle De L'ombre / Walk On" – 4:15
"Unsaid, Undone" – 2:50
"Welcome Back" – 2:47
"Nook" – 3:33
"No Love" – 5:05
"Incredible Change of Our Alien" – 5:24
"This Sorry Confession" – 2:46
"Another Year Without Me" – (Micha Acher) - 3:30
"One Dark Love Poem" – 2:50
"Only Thing We Own" – 1:51
"I'm a Whale" – 6:06

Personnel
 Markus Acher - guitar, vocals; saxophone (1)
 Micha Acher - bass, trumpet
 Martin Messerschmid - drums
 Olu Fummi Layo-Ajayi - vocals (2)

1992 albums
The Notwist albums